Christopher Hall is an American cryptographer and mathematician, specializing in arithmetic geometry. He is one of the creators of the cryptosystem Twofish. He obtained a BS from the University of Colorado-Boulder Department of Computer Science and a PhD in Mathematics from Princeton University in 2003, under Nick Katz.

He is an associate professor of mathematics at the University of Western Ontario.

References

External links
Home page

American cryptographers
Living people
Year of birth missing (living people)
Princeton University alumni
Academic staff of the University of Western Ontario